Carea obsolescens is a moth of the family Nolidae first described by Frederic Moore in 1883. It is found in Sri Lanka.

References

Moths of Asia
Moths described in 1883
Nolidae